Bebington is a town in Wirral, Merseyside, England.  It contains seven buildings that are recorded in the National Heritage List for England as designated listed buildings.  Of these, one is listed at  Grade I, the highest of the three grades, and the others are at Grade II, the lowest grade.  The listed buildings consist of two churches, two houses, a sundial, and a former public house.

Key

Buildings

References

Citations

Sources

Listed buildings in Merseyside
Lists of listed buildings in Merseyside